Erythrolamprus dorsocorallinus is a species of snake in the family Colubridae. The species is found in Venezuela, Brazil, Bolivia, and Peru.

References

Erythrolamprus
Reptiles of Venezuela
Reptiles of Brazil
Reptiles of Bolivia
Reptiles of Peru
Reptiles described in 2007